The 2015 South Carolina State Bulldogs football team represented South Carolina State University in the 2015 NCAA Division I FCS football season. They were led by 14th year head coach Oliver Pough and played their home games at Oliver C. Dawson Stadium. They were a member of the Mid-Eastern Athletic Conference. They finished the season 7–4, 6–2 in MEAC play to finish in fourth place.

Schedule

References

South Carolina State
South Carolina State Bulldogs football seasons
South Carolina State Bulldogs football